Eric National Mack (born 1987, Columbia, Maryland) is an American painter, multi-media installation artist, and sculptor, based in New York City.

Early life and education
Mack was born in Columbia, Maryland. His middle name is National, after Washington DC's National Gallery of Art—where his parents met. At an early age, Mack worked for his father at his discount clothing store interacting with a spectrum of fashions and fabrics. Mack's fabric collages often include a spectrum of materials such as moving blankets, bandanas, and other found or locally sourced fabrics. 

Mack received his BFA from The Cooper Union in 2010 and his MFA from Yale in 2012. In a 2019 interview with Mahfuz Sultan for PIN-UP Magazine, he is quoted stating that he made most of his work outside while at Yale.

Exhibitions and residencies 
Solo exhibitions

 Eric N. Mack, Douglas Hyde Galllery, Trinity College, Dublin, Ireland (2022)
 Eric N. Mack: Cuts, Móran Móran, Los Angeles, CA (2022)
 Eric N. Mack: Lemme walk across the room, NSU Art Museum, Fort Lauderdale, FL (based on an exhibition originally presented by the Brooklyn Museum) (2021-2022) 
 Eric N. Mack: Face It, Móran Móran, Los Angeles, CA (2020)
 In austerity, stripped from its support and worn as a sarong, The Power Station, Dallas, TX (2019)
 Dye Lens, Scrap Metal Gallery, Toronto, Canada (2019)
 Lemme walk across the room, Brooklyn Museum, NY (2019)
 the BALTIC Artists’ Award 2017, BALTIC Centre for Contemporary Art, Gateshead, UK (2017)
 Eric Mack: Vogue Fabrics, Albright–Knox Art Gallery, Buffalo, NY (2017)
 Eric N. Mack: Never Had A Dream, Móran Móran, Los Angeles, CA (2015)

Group exhibitions

 Looking Back / The 12th White Columns Annual, curated by Mary Manning, White Columns (2022)
 Whitney Biennial, 2019, Whitney Museum of American Art, New York, NY (2019)
 Grace Wales Bonner: A Time for New Dreams, Serpentine Gallery, London, UK (2018)
 Ungestalt, Kunsthalle Basel, Basel, Switzerland (2017)
 In the Abstract, Massachusetts Museum of Contemporary Art, Massachusetts, MA (2017)
 Blue Black, Pulitzer Arts Foundation, St Louis, MO (2017)
 Making & Unmaking: An exhibition curated by Duro Olowu, Camden Arts Centre, London, UK (2016)
 Greater New York 2015, MoMA PS1, Long Island City, NY (2015)

Residencies
2017 Rauschenberg Residency
2014–2015 The Studio Museum in Harlem Artist-in-Residency Program

Public collections
Albright-Knox Gallery, Buffalo, NY
The Studio Museum in Harlem, New York, NY
Whitney Museum of American Art, New York, NY
Hood Museum of Art, Hanover, NH

Selected bibliography 

 Vitamin T: Threads & Textiles in Contemporary Art (Phaidon, 2019)
 Prime: Art's Next Generation (Phaidon, 2022)
 Young, Gifted, and Black (DAP, 2020)

References

External links
‘Style Waits for No Bitch’: Eric N. Mack’s Fashion Icons
Meet the Mixed-Media Painter Inspired by Lil’ Kim – New York Times

Living people
African-American painters
1987 births
African-American contemporary artists
American contemporary artists
American contemporary painters
Artists from Maryland
Painters from Maryland
Sculptors from Maryland
African-American sculptors
21st-century African-American people
20th-century African-American people